(The) Blaze Star can refer to:
 T Coronae Borealis,  a recurring nova (star) in the constellation Corona Borealis
 Blaze Starr, an American former stripper and American burlesque performer